Hush Money is a lost 1921 American silent drama film directed by Charles Maigne and written by Charles Maigne and Samuel Merwin. The film stars Alice Brady, George Fawcett, Larry Wheat, Harry Benham, and Jerry Devine. The film was released in November 1921, by Paramount Pictures.

Plot
As described in a film magazine, Evelyn Murray (Brady), daughter of powerful New York financier Alexander Murray (Fawcett), runs down a poor boy with her car, and her fiance persuades her to flee before determining the extent of his injuries. Her father pays hush money to the only witness of the accident to thwart her determination to admit her connection. Conscience stricken, Evelyn breaks her engagement, leaves home, and takes up charity work under the supervision of the young Bishop Deems (Benham). Eventually she is victorious in the ensuing conflict of wills and brings about her father's reformation and the renewal of her engagement.

Cast
Alice Brady as Evelyn Murray
George Fawcett as Alexander Murray
Larry Wheat as Bert Van Vliet 
Harry Benham as Bishop Deems
Jerry Devine as Terry McGuire

References

External links

1921 films
1920s English-language films
Silent American drama films
1921 drama films
Paramount Pictures films
Films directed by Charles Maigne
Lost American films
American black-and-white films
American silent feature films
1921 lost films
Lost drama films
1920s American films